The 2019 Delaware Fightin' Blue Hens football team represented the University of Delaware as a member of the Colonial Athletic Association (CAA) during the 2019 NCAA Division I FCS football season. Led by third-year head coach Danny Rocco, the Fightin' Blue Hens compiled an overall record of 5–7 with a mark of 3–5 in conference play, tying for ninth place in the CAA. The team played home games at Delaware Stadium in Newark, Delaware. The stadium underwent renovations prior to the 2019 season.

Previous season

The Fightin' Blue Hens finished the 2018 season 7–5, 5–3 in CAA play to finish tied for third in the conference. Delaware also returned to the FCS Playoffs for the first time since 2010, falling in the first round to CAA rival James Madison.

Preseason

CAA poll
In the CAA preseason poll released on July 23, 2019, the Fightin' Blue Hens were predicted to finish in fifth place.

Preseason All–CAA team
The Fightin' Blue Hens had two players selected to the preseason all-CAA team.

Offense

Mario Farinella – OL

Special teams

Nick Pritchard – P

Schedule
Delaware scheduled 12 games in the 2019 season instead of the 11 normally allowed for FCS programs. Under a standard provision of NCAA rules, all FCS teams are allowed to schedule 12 regular-season games in years in which the period starting with Labor Day weekend and ending with the last Saturday of November contains 14 Saturdays.

Coaching staff

Game summaries

Delaware State

at Rhode Island

North Dakota State

Penn

at Pittsburgh

at Elon

New Hampshire

Richmond

at Towson

Albany

Stony Brook

at Villanova

Ranking movements

References

Delaware
Delaware Fightin' Blue Hens football seasons
Delaware Fightin' Blue Hens football